Professor Imhof or When the Heart Speaks to the Young (German: Wenn das Herz der Jugend spricht) is a 1926 German silent drama film directed by Fred Sauer and starring Albert Bassermann, Lee Parry and Paul Henckels.

The film's sets were designed by the art directors Otto Erdmann and Hans Sohnle.

Cast
 Albert Bassermann as Professor Imhof  
 Lee Parry 
 Paul Henckels as Dr. Kerber  
 Julius Messaros as Lucian  
 Else Wasa as Frau von Arnsberg  
 S.Z. Sakall as Dr. Hecht  
 Frieda Lehndorf 
 Sophie Pagay 
 Philipp Manning

References

Bibliography
 Grange, William. Cultural Chronicle of the Weimar Republic. Scarecrow Press, 2008.

External links

1926 films
Films of the Weimar Republic
German silent feature films
Films directed by Fred Sauer
1926 drama films
German drama films
German black-and-white films
Silent drama films
1920s German films
1920s German-language films